The WWA World Tag Team Championship was the primary tag team title in the Indianapolis-based World Wrestling Association from the promotion's formation in 1964 until the late 1980s when the promotion closed.

Title history

References

Tag team wrestling championships